Familie Meier is a German television series. After the six-part Zeit genug, Familie Meier was Bogner's first long-term pre-evening series. He established himself in this genre, which until then had been occupied solely by Helmut Dietl. Cult series such as Irgendwie und Sowieso, Zur Freiheit, Café Meineid and München 7 followed.

See also
List of German television series

References

External links
 

1981 German television series debuts
1983 German television series endings
Television shows set in Munich
German-language television shows
Das Erste original programming